Ryan Colin Shotton (born 30 October 1988) is an English professional footballer and manager who plays as a defender. He is currently player/manager of Midland League club Hanley Town.

Shotton progressed through the Stoke City Academy and signed a professional contract in 2007. He went on loan to Altrincham, Tranmere Rovers and Barnsley respectively to gain first team experience. He broke into the Stoke squad towards the end of the 2010–11 season. He played in the UEFA Europa League in 2011–12 scoring against Maccabi Tel Aviv. In September 2013 Shotton joined Wigan Athletic on loan. He then joined Derby County on loan in August 2014 before completing a permanent move in January 2015. In 2016, he spent time on loan at Birmingham City, and signed for them permanently in June of that year, before moving on to Middlesbrough in August 2017 where he spent three seasons. He played briefly for Leek Town before joining A-League club Melbourne Victory in 2020.

Career

Stoke City

Born in Fenton, Staffordshire, Shotton joined his local league side, Stoke City, where he progressed through the youth ranks and was handed a professional contract in 2007. He then moved on loan to Altrincham of the Conference National, where he spent most of the 2007–08 season. He began at centre back before slotting into the right-back position, and he also played some matches as a forward, scoring five goals. Shotton won the Supporters' Player of the Year award for his performances on loan at Altrincham. He made his debut for Stoke on 26 August 2008 in a 3–2 victory over Cheltenham Town in the League Cup, coming on as a substitute in the 90th minute.

He then joined League One club Tranmere Rovers on a one-month loan on 29 August 2008, and made his debut four days later, at home to Accrington Stanley in a 1–0 win in the Football League Trophy. He scored his first goal for Tranmere away at Huddersfield Town, heading in the winner to clinch a 2–1 victory. His loan at Rovers was extended until the end of the 2008–09 season. On 23 September 2009 Shotton and teammate Carl Dickinson joined Championship side Barnsley on loan for three months. Both spent the entire season with the club, and Shotton made 30 appearances.

Shotton signed a two-year contract extension in September 2010 keeping him at the Britannia Stadium until 2013. He made his first appearance on the Stoke bench for a league game against Wigan Athletic in December 2010. He made his home debut for Stoke in an FA Cup match against Cardiff City on 8 January 2011 and played the full 90 minutes. He described it as one of the proudest moments of his life.

He made his Premier League debut for Stoke in a 0–0 draw with Blackpool at Bloomfield Road on 30 April 2011. Shotton appeared to have scored his first goal for Stoke in a 1–0 win over Hajduk Split in the UEFA Europa League where he was playing as a makeshift centre forward, but the goal was officially recorded as an own goal. He did score in the 89th minute of the Premier League match against West Bromwich Albion on 28 August to secure a 1–0 win, and scored in the Europa League against Maccabi Tel Aviv on 20 October. Shotton signed a new four-year contract with Stoke in November 2011. He made his first Premier League start for Stoke on 3 December, in an away win over Everton where he played at right midfield in place of Jermaine Pennant, and said that the first half of the season could not have gone better for him.

He was named Stoke's Young Player of the Season for 2011–12, despite an indifferent run of form after Christmas until the end of the season, and he began 2012–13 out of the first team frame. But following injuries to Marc Wilson and Andy Wilkinson, Shotton had the opportunity to return to the starting line-up in November 2012. He was warned by manager Tony Pulis that he needed to "get his head together" to remain in the side. He played 26 times for Stoke in 2012–13, as the Potters finished in 13th position, and often came in for criticism from supporters.

At the start of the 2013–14 season, Shotton failed to make force his way into new manager Mark Hughes' plans. A permanent transfer to Wigan Athletic fell through, but he joined the Championship club on loan until 2 January 2014. He made 14 appearances for the Latics, scoring once, in a 2–0 victory against Ipswich Town on 22 September.

Derby County

On 25 August 2014, Shotton joined Derby County on loan with a view to a permanent deal. He made the move permanent on 1 January 2015, signing a two-and-a-half-year contract for an undisclosed fee.

Shotton joined fellow Championship club Birmingham City on 28 January 2016 on loan until the end of the season. He made his debut on 13 February, replacing Paul Caddis at right back for the goalless draw at Rotherham United. He played in the next two matches before Caddis was restored to the starting eleven. His next appearance was five weeks later away at Reading; he started the match at centre back alongside Michael Morrison, and scored Birmingham's second goal in their 2–0 win after 27 minutes when David Cotterill's free kick was parried by Reading's goalkeeper. Playing in his preferred position and hoping for a permanent move, Shotton kept his place for the next five matches, and succeeded in impressing manager Gary Rowett to the extent that he would consider making an offer for the player if he were available.

Birmingham City
Shotton signed a three-year contract with Birmingham City on 30 June 2016. The fee was undisclosed, but was later reported to be around £300,000. He began the season partnering Morrison at the centre of a back four; he felt they worked well together, and the pair established themselves as a strong defensively sound pairing. Rowett commented that Shotton's athleticism enabled the team to defend higher up the pitch and that his concentration and decision-making were improving. The following week, Shotton admitted responsibility for slack marking that allowed Steven Caulker to score an equaliser for Queens Park Rangers, and then produced a fine performance as Birmingham drew 1–1 in the local derby against newly relegated Aston Villa in Octoberwith his dreadlocks dyed blue for the occasion. He scored twice in the first half of the season: the opening goal in a 2–2 draw at home to Preston North End and Birmingham's second goal away to Brentford at the end of November that secured a 2–1 win. After that match, Rowett praised Shotton's progress both in terms of concentration and as Morrison's defensive partnerboth had played every minute of the campaign thus farbut reminded him that he needed to remain focused in training as well as on the pitch.

Two weeks later, with the team just outside the play-off positions, Rowett was replaced by Gianfranco Zola, who retained Shotton and Morrison as his central defenders of choice in a three-man back line. In early February, Morrison underwent a hernia operation that was to keep him out until the last two matches of the season, and Shotton himself missed three matches with a groin injury. On his return, he played alongside a variety of defenders as Birmingham slipped towards relegation. Zola's replacement by Harry Redknapp with three matches left coincided with Morrison's return to the team, and in a final fixture that Shotton later compared to soldiers in the trenches, the pair helped Birmingham keep a clean sheet away to Bristol City to protect a 1–0 lead and secure Championship survival. He finished the season with 43 league appearances, more than any other Birmingham player.

Shotton said he was happy at Birmingham, and would consider extending his contract. But after the arrival of Marc Roberts as first choice alongside Morrison, and with the club actively pursuing other central defenders, Redknapp stated that Shotton wanted to leave. He reportedly turned down a move to Bristol City, and bids from Hull City and Middlesbrough were rejected by the club, but on 10 August Redknapp confirmed that a deal had been agreed with Middlesbrough, but that Shotton would not leave until replacements arrived. He was not included in the matchday squad until the fourth match of the season, at home to Bolton Wanderers, and when Morrison broke his nose in the first half, it was Shotton who replaced him. Wearing a protective mask, Morrison was fit to start the next match three days later and Shotton, whose wife had recently given birth, was again omitted. Eventually, with the transfer window closing and Birmingham about to sign Harlee Dean from Brentford, Shotton was free to complete his move to Middlesbrough.

Middlesbrough
Shotton signed a three-year contract with newly relegated Championship club Middlesbrough on 30 August 2017; the fee was undisclosed, though was widely reported as £3 million. He later refused a contract extension so now plys his trade in non-league after drifting around Australia.

Leek Town 
On 31 October 2020, Shotton made an FA Trophy appearance for Northern Premier League First Division South East club Leek Town. They lost 3–2 to Evesham United. Four days later he played a in a 3–2 League win against Ilkeston.

Melbourne Victory 
Shotton signed for Melbourne Victory on 18 December 2020. He played seven A-League matches in the early part of 2021, but his season was disrupted first by a groin injury and then by a knee injury sustained during his comeback match, and he left the club by mutual consent in May.

Style of play
Shotton plays as a right back and due to his  frame he can also be used as a makeshift centre forward. He also has the ability to perform a long throw-in similar to that of Rory Delap. Tony Pulis also played Shotton at right wing on a number of occasions.

Personal life
His older brother, Liam, is also a footballer who played professionally in Singapore's S.League and in non-League football in England. His cousin Saul Shotton is also a footballer.

Shotton was charged with assault at a nightclub in Hanley in June 2012. He was found not guilty in December 2012. As of November 2020, Shotton owned the Black Lion pub in Cheddleton.

Career statistics

Honours
Stoke City
FA Cup runner-up: 2010–11

Individual
Stoke City Young Player of the Season: 2011–12

References

External links

1988 births
Living people
People from Fenton, Staffordshire
Footballers from Stoke-on-Trent
English footballers
Association football defenders
Association football utility players
Stoke City F.C. players
Altrincham F.C. players
Tranmere Rovers F.C. players
Barnsley F.C. players
Wigan Athletic F.C. players
Derby County F.C. players
Birmingham City F.C. players
Middlesbrough F.C. players
Leek Town F.C. players
Melbourne Victory FC players
Hanley Town F.C. players
National League (English football) players
English Football League players
Premier League players
Northern Premier League players
A-League Men players
Black British sportsmen
Hanley Town F.C. managers